The asthenosphere is the mechanically weak and ductile region of the upper mantle of Earth. However, the lower boundary of the asthenosphere is not well defined.

The asthenosphere is almost solid, but a slight amount of melting (less than 0.1% of the rock) contributes to its mechanical weakness. More extensive decompression melting of the asthenosphere takes place where it wells upwards, and this is the most important source of magma on Earth. It is the source of mid-ocean ridge basalt (MORB) and of some magmas that erupted above subduction zones or in regions of continental rifting.

Characteristics 
  
The asthenosphere is a part of the upper mantle just below the lithosphere that is involved in plate tectonic movement and isostatic adjustments. It is composed of peridotite, a rock containing mostly the minerals olivine and pyroxene. The lithosphere-asthenosphere boundary is conventionally taken at the  isotherm. Below this temperature (closer to the surface) the mantle behaves rigidly; above this temperature (deeper below the surface) it acts in a ductile fashion. The asthenosphere is where the mantle rock most closely approaches its melting point, and a small amount of melt is likely to present in this layer.

Seismic waves pass relatively slowly through the asthenosphere compared to the overlying lithospheric mantle. The LVZ also has a high seismic attenuation (seismic waves moving through the asthenosphere lose energy) and significant anisotropy (shear waves polarized vertically have a lower velocity than shear waves polarized horizontally). The discovery of the LVZ alerted seismologists to the existence of the asthenosphere and gave some information about its physical properties, as the speed of seismic waves decreases with decreasing rigidity.
This decrease in seismic wave velocity from the lithosphere to the asthenosphere could be caused by the presence of a very small percentage of melt in the asthenosphere, though since the asthenosphere transmits S waves, it cannot be fully melted.

In the oceanic mantle, the transition from the lithosphere to the asthenosphere (the LAB) is shallower than for the continental mantle (about 60 km in some old oceanic regions) with a sharp and large velocity drop (5–10%). At the mid-ocean ridges, the LAB rises to within a few kilometers of the ocean floor.

The upper part of the asthenosphere is believed to be the zone upon which the great rigid and brittle lithospheric plates of the Earth's crust move about. Due to the temperature and pressure conditions in the asthenosphere, rock becomes ductile, moving at rates of deformation measured in cm/yr over lineal distances eventually measuring thousands of kilometers. In this way, it flows like a convection current, radiating heat outward from the Earth's interior. Above the asthenosphere, at the same rate of deformation, rock behaves elastically and, being brittle, can break, causing faults. The rigid lithosphere is thought to "float" or move about on the slowly flowing asthenosphere, enabling isostatic equilibrium and allowing the movement of tectonic plates.

Boundaries 

Lithosphere-asthenosphere boundary 

The lithosphere-asthenosphere boundary (LAB) is relatively sharp and likely coincides with the onset of partial melting or a change in composition or anisotropy. Various definitions of the boundary reflect various aspects of the boundary region. In addition to the mechanical boundary defined by seismic data, which reflects the transition from the rigid lithosphere to ductile asthenosphere, these include a thermal boundary layer, above which heat is transported by thermal conduction and below which heat is conduction largely by convection; a rheological boundary, where the viscosity drops below about 1021 Pa-s; and a chemical boundary layer, above which the mantle rock is depleted in volatiles and enriched in magnesium relative to the rock below.

Lower boundary of asthenosphere 
The lower boundary of the asthenosphere is less well-defined, but has been placed at the base of the upper mantle. This boundary is neither seismically sharp nor well understood but is approximately coincident with the complex 670 km discontinuity. This discontinuity is generally linked to the transition from mantle rock containing ringwoodite to mantle rock containing bridgmanite and periclase.

Origin
The mechanical properties of the asthenosphere are widely attributed to the partial melting of the rock. It is likely that a small amount of melt is present through much of the asthenosphere, where it is stabilized by the traces of volatiles (water and carbon dioxide) present in the mantle rock. However, the likely amount of melt, not more than about 0.1% of the rock, seems inadequate to fully explain the existence of the asthenosphere. This is not enough melt to fully wet grain boundaries in the rock, and the effects of melt on the mechanical properties of the rock are not expected to be significant if the grain boundaries are not fully wetted. The sharp lithosphere-asthenosphere boundary is also difficult to explain by partial melting alone. It is possible that melt accumulates at the top of the asthenosphere, where it is trapped by the impermeable rock of the lithosphere. Another possibility is that the asthenosphere is a zone of minimum water solubility in mantle minerals so that more water is available to form greater quantities of melt. Another possible mechanism for producing mechanical weakness is grain boundary sliding, where grains slide slightly past each other under stress, lubricated by the traces of volatiles present.

Numerical models of mantle convection in which the viscosity is dependent both on temperature and strain rate reliably produce an oceanic asthenosphere, suggesting that strain-rate weakening is a significant contributing mechanism.

Magma generation 
Decompression melting of asthenospheric rock creeping towards the surface is the most important source of magma on Earth. Most of this erupts at mid-ocean ridges to form the distinctive mid-ocean ridge basalt (MORB) of the ocean crust. Magmas are also generated by decompressional melting of the asthenosphere above subduction zones and in areas of continental rifting.

This dehydrates the remaining solid rock and is likely the origin of the chemically depleted lithosphere.

See also

References

Bibliography

External links
 San Diego State University, "The Earth's internal heat energy and interior structure" 

Structure of the Earth
Plate tectonics